Elizabethtown is a 2005 American romantic tragicomedy film written and directed by Cameron Crowe and distributed by Paramount Pictures. Its story follows a young shoe designer, Drew Baylor, who is fired from his job after costing his company an industry record of nearly one billion dollars. On the verge of suicide, Drew receives a call from his sister telling him that their father has died while visiting their former hometown of Elizabethtown, Kentucky. Deciding to postpone his suicide and bring their father's body back to Oregon, he then becomes involved in an unexpected romance with Claire Colburn, who he meets near the start of his journey. Elizabethtown stars Orlando Bloom, Kirsten Dunst, Alec Baldwin, and Susan Sarandon.

The film was produced by Cruise/Wagner Productions and Vinyl Films. It premiered September 4, 2005, at the 2005 Venice Film Festival and was released worldwide on October 14, 2005. It grossed $10.6 million in its opening weekend and $52.2 million worldwide, against a budget of $45 million. It received generally negative reviews from critics.

Plot
Drew Baylor is a shoe designer for Mercury, a global sportswear company. When his latest shoe, meant to be his great life accomplishment, is found to have a flaw, it costs the company $972 million, and Drew is shamed by his boss, Phil, before he is asked to speak to the press—his future unknown and likely finished at Mercury.

Disappointed in his failure, and the subsequent breakup with his fair-weather office girlfriend, Ellen, Drew stacks his expensive clothes and other valuables on the street for scavengers to take, then prepares to commit suicide. He stops at the last moment to answer a persistent phone caller, who turns out to be his sister, Heather, telling him that his father, Mitch, has died while visiting family in Elizabethtown, Kentucky. When his mother, Hollie, refuses to go because of a long-time dispute between her and the Kentucky Baylors, who are bitter about Hollie and Mitch moving to the West Coast, Drew volunteers to retrieve his father's remains and plans to go through with the suicide upon his return. 

On the flight to Kentucky, Drew meets flight attendant Claire, who is managing the almost completely empty 747. To make her shift easier, she strikes up a conversation with Drew and invites him to move up to first-class seating. Depressed about his work failure, he tries to ignore the bubbly, quirky Claire who has nothing to do on the flight except talk to him incessantly about Kentucky and alludes to her boyfriend, "Ben", who is a workaholic. At the end of the trip, Claire gives him a paper with directions, helpful tips, and her phone number to help him get to his destination before they part. Drew dismisses Claire, who seems to be trying to get the last of his attentions as he seeks the airport exit.

Arriving to Elizabethtown, Drew is met by the family. He makes arrangements for cremation at his mother's request, despite the family's objections. While staying at a hotel, where a raucous bachelor party and wedding reception is being held, Drew calls his mother and sister, then his ex, Ellen, as he struggles with boredom and depression. Finally, he calls Claire, who is also alone because Ben is away working, and they talk for hours. She impulsively suggests they meet at sunrise, before she has to depart on a flight to Hawaii. They have a quiet, platonic moment, and then they part ways as she leaves for her trip.

Drew struggles between the family members and his mother's demands regarding burial arrangements. His mother is manically attempting self-improvement to compensate for the loss of her husband. Claire suddenly appears at the hotel, claiming Drew's needs for help outweigh her needs for a tropical vacation. They tour various parts of Kentucky and she helps him at the funeral home, picking out the urn and keeping Drew emotionally on track.

During a post-dinner discussion with the older family, Drew sees the stovetop flame and panics about the cremation. Rushing to the funeral home, he is too late to stop his father's cremation. Solemn, he takes the urn back to the hotel, where Claire has crashed the bachelorette party. Things lead to their physical conclusion in his hotel room, but Drew is still wrapped up in his job and self-pity and they part on strained terms.

Hollie and Heather arrive for the service, and Hollie, with newfound self-confidence, makes a breakthrough with the family with a standup comedy routine and a farewell tap dance to Mitch. Claire arrives, and tells Drew to take a final trip with his father, giving him a binder box with customized itineraries and mix CDs for the road trip. Drew follows Claire's map home, spreading his father's ashes at memorable destinations along the way until he reaches the "World's Second Largest Farmer's Market" in Nebraska. There, a series of notes and clues gives him a choice: to either follow the map home or to go in a new direction, searching for the "girl in the red hat." He finds Claire, they kiss, and Drew realizes he loves her.

Cast

 Orlando Bloom as Drew Baylor
 Kirsten Dunst as Claire Colburn
 Susan Sarandon as Hollie Baylor
 Alec Baldwin as Phil DeVoss
 Bruce McGill as Bill Banyon
 Judy Greer as Heather Baylor
 Jessica Biel as Ellen Kishmore
 Paul Schneider as Jesse Baylor
 Loudon Wainwright III as Uncle Dale
 Gailard Sartain as Charles Dean
 Jed Rees as Chuck Hasboro
 Jim Fitzpatrick as Rusty
 Paula Deen as Aunt Dora
 Dan Biggers as Uncle Roy
 Alice Marie Crowe as Aunt Lena
 Tim Devitt as Mitch Baylor
 Ted Manson as Sad Joe
 Shane Lyons as Charlie Bill
 Emily Rutherfurd as Cindy Hasboro

Production
Jane Fonda was cast in Sarandon's role, but had to drop out. Ashton Kutcher, Seann William Scott, Colin Hanks, Chris Evans, and James Franco all auditioned for Bloom's part. Kutcher was actually hired to play Drew, but director Cameron Crowe decided during filming that the chemistry between him and Dunst was not right and Kutcher left the project. Biel auditioned for the female lead, but was given a smaller role as Drew's ex-girlfriend.

There is a character named Ben who is mentioned as a love interest of Claire. In the original cut of the film, Ben is revealed to be Claire's brother.

Recognizable settings for scenes shot in Louisville, Kentucky, include the Brown Hotel, Highland Middle School, and Cave Hill Cemetery. Opening scene shows a helicopter flying over downtown Portland, Oregon, and the Fremont Bridge. Although the exterior, lobby, and corridors of the Brown Hotel are seen, the hotel's Crystal Ball Room was replicated on a soundstage. While Bloom's character is supposedly driving to Elizabethtown, he is traveling in the wrong direction.

Despite the film's title, most of the smalltown scenes were filmed in Versailles, Kentucky. Only two scenes portraying distinctive landmarks were filmed in Elizabethtown, because many of its historic buildings have been replaced by chain stores and Urban sprawl. A few scenes were filmed in LaGrange. Other local scenes were filmed in Otter Creek Park in Meade County, near Brandenburg. Filming also took place in Scottsbluff, Nebraska; Eureka Springs, Arkansas; Memphis, Tennessee; and Oklahoma City.

In the original cut of the film shown at the Toronto International Film Festival, an epilogue reveals that the flaw in the shoe designed by Drew, that it whistles while walking, turns out to be a hit with consumers. This was cut from the release version of the film to prevent the ending from seeming overly drawn-out.

Joni Mitchell's painting Hyde Park appears in the film. One of her paintings had previously appeared in Crowe's Vanilla Sky (2001).

Themes 
On a second viewing of the movie, Roger Ebert makes the observation that the film is really a hidden story of an angel who has fallen from grace. Claire, the angel, is met in the heavens (the empty plane) and has decided to guide Drew through his depression, suicidal thoughts and redeem himself from failure. Character names, the corporation, etc. were found to be allusions to Hell, The Bible, sin and the devil. Drew has to redeem and cleanse himself from working with the devil. Claire also needs to make the choice to remain on Earth at the end. The movie is thought to take various cues from the films It's a Wonderful Life (1946), City of Angels (1998), and Dogma (1999).

Release

Critical reception 
Elizabethtown received mostly negative reviews from critics. Rotten Tomatoes gives the film a 28% approval rating based on 177 reviews, with an average score of 4.7/10. The site's consensus is "this story of a floundering shoe designer who returns home for a family tragedy gets lost in undeveloped plot lines and lackluster performances." It holds a Metacritic score of 45 out of 100 from 37 critics. Audiences polled by CinemaScore gave the film an average grade of "B" on an A+ to F scale.

Film critic Roger Ebert gave the film a positive review with three stars out of four. He describes the story as the most unrelenting "Meet Cute" in movie history. He went on to say "the film is nowhere near one of Crowe's great films (like Almost Famous), but it is sweet and good-hearted and has some real laughs." Ebert later reprinted on his site an analysis of the film pointing out various plot elements supporting the idea that Claire is actually an angel.

In his review, Nathan Rabin of The A.V. Club created the term "Manic Pixie Dream Girl" to describe the "bubbly, shallow cinematic creature" stock character type that he stated Dunst plays in the film.

Box office
Elizabethtown was commercially released on October 14, 2005, in the United States. It was distributed to 2,517 theaters and grossed $4,050,915 on its opening day. At the end of its opening weekend, the film had grossed $10,618,711, making it the third-highest gross for that weekend. Overall, the film grossed $52,034,889 worldwide during its 68-day release.

Soundtrack

The film features dozens of contemporary rock songs, and Kentucky natives My Morning Jacket appear as 'Ruckus', a fictional rock group who reunite during the film.

See also
 Manic Pixie Dream Girl
 Films about angels

References

External links

 

2005 films
2005 romantic comedy-drama films
American romantic comedy-drama films
Cruise/Wagner Productions films
Elizabethtown, Kentucky
2000s English-language films
Films directed by Cameron Crowe
Films produced by Cameron Crowe
Films produced by Tom Cruise
Films set in Kentucky
Films set in Oregon
Films shot in Arkansas
Films shot in Kentucky
Films shot in Nebraska
Films shot in Oklahoma
Films shot in Portland, Oregon
Films shot in Tennessee
Films with screenplays by Cameron Crowe
Films about angels
Paramount Pictures films
Tragicomedy films
Vinyl Films films
American road comedy-drama films
2000s American films